Abdullah bin Mutaib Al Saud (born 13 October 1984) is a Saudi Arabian show jumping rider and member of House of Saud.

Early life and education
Prince Abdullah was born in London on 13 October 1984. He is the son of Mutaib bin Abdullah, the minister of national guard. His mother is Jawahir, the daughter of Abdallah bin Abdul Rahman Al Saud. Prince Abdullah holds a law degree from King Saud University.

Sports career
Prince Abdullah participated in various show jumping events. He competed at the 2008 Summer Olympic in Beijing and also participated in 2012 London Olympics. Saudi Arabia's equestrian show jumping team, including Prince Abdullah, won a bronze medal in the 2012 Summer Olympics. Prince Abdullah finished the rounds with a score of 13 faults.

References

External links

1984 births
Living people
Abdullah bin Mutaib
English people of Saudi Arabian descent
King Saud University alumni
Olympic equestrians of Saudi Arabia
Saudi Arabian male equestrians
Equestrians at the 2008 Summer Olympics
Equestrians at the 2012 Summer Olympics
Olympic bronze medalists for Saudi Arabia
Olympic medalists in equestrian
Medalists at the 2012 Summer Olympics
Royal Olympic medalists
Asian Games medalists in equestrian
Equestrians at the 2006 Asian Games
Equestrians at the 2010 Asian Games
Asian Games gold medalists for Saudi Arabia
Medalists at the 2006 Asian Games
Medalists at the 2010 Asian Games